Captain Applejack is a 1931 American Pre-Code comedy film, produced and distributed by Warner Brothers. The film was directed by Hobart Henley and stars John Halliday, Mary Brian, and Arthur Edmund Carewe. The film was based on a 1921 play of the same name, starring Wallace Eddinger and written by Walter C. Hackett. The play had previously been filmed as a silent film in 1923 under the title of Strangers of the Night.

Plot
Ambrose Applejohn lives in an extravagant old mansion with his ward, played by Poppy Faire, and his elderly aunt. Poppy is in love with Applejohn but he doesn't realize it and treats her like a child. Applejohn is bored with his sheltered and mundane live and craves excitement. He plans to sell the family mansion and use the money to travel around the world on a quest for adventure and excitement.

Aunt Agatha is shocked when she finds out about her nephew's plans while Poppy supports him. Applejohn, however, soon finds unexpected adventure, danger, mystery and excitement right in his own house. On a dark and stormy night, a mysterious woman, Madame Anna Valeska, knocks on the door, seeking shelter from the storm and from a violent man, Ivan Borolsky, who is apparently pursuing her. As a matter of fact, the two are a pair of thieves seeking a treasure which is hidden in the Applejohn home. This treasure was hidden in the house by a pirate ancestor, known as Captain Applejack.

Ivan Borolsky shows up at the house but, eventually, Applejohn manages to get Borolsky and Valeska out of the house. Applejohn falls asleep and dreams of his pirate ancestor, of his ship, and of his conquest of a pretty woman, who is at first resistant, but in the end completely surrenders to him. When he awakes he finds that a parchment really exists in the house and that his visitors are really thieves and are seeking a hidden treasure. He races to find the treasures indicated on the parchment before the thieves can find it themselves. In the end he put the villains to rout, finds the treasure and discovers that he also loves Poppy.

Pre-Code aspects
The film is filled with pre-code material, especially during the pirate dream sequence. During that sequence, Captain Applejack brazenly forces a woman to submit to his sexual advances and actually grabs her breasts.

Cast
John Halliday as Ambrose Applejohn  
Mary Brian as Poppy Faire
Kay Strozzi as Madame Anna Valeska
Arthur Edmund Carewe as Ivan "Jim" Borolsky 
Alec B. Francis as Lush, the butler 
Louise Closser Hale as Aunt Agatha  
Claud Allister as John Jason 
Julia Swayne Gordon as Mrs. Kate Pengard
Otto Hoffman as Horace Pengard  
William B. Davidson as Bill Dennett

References
Notes

External links

1931 films
Warner Bros. films
American black-and-white films
Films scored by Louis Silvers
American films based on plays
Remakes of American films
Sound film remakes of silent films
American comedy films
1931 comedy films
1930s English-language films
1930s American films